Redcurrent is a New Zealand homewares retailer. It was founded in 1999 in Hawke's Bay by Rebecca Kain and her mother Audrey McHardy. In 2019, Redcurrent had twelve stores operating across New Zealand, as well as an online store.

In early 2023, Redcurrent was put into voluntary liquidation due to falling sales and retail challenges caused by the COVID-19 pandemic. The process is ongoing.

History 
Redcurrent was founded in 1999 in Havelock North, an area of Hawke's Bay, New Zealand. It was started by Rebecca Kain and her mother Audrey McHardy. The company began as a project importing and selling wooden animals made in Bali, and operated out of four sheds.

The company went on to setup several stores across New Zealand, including Auckland, Wellington, Havelock North, Christchurch, and Queenstown. It also offered an online store which shipped goods to New Zealand and Australia. The company had 11 physical stores at the peak of its operation, including three locations in Auckland and two in Christchurch.

In 2011, the Redcurrent store in Christchurch was damaged in the 2011 Christchurch earthquake and required repairs. Despite this, the company opened a second Christchurch store in The Colombo shopping center, only months after the disaster.

In 2020, Redcurrent went on a rent strike after the company suffered losses as the result of a nationwide lockdown during the COVID-19 pandemic. Kain protested paying rent to lease commercial space during the lockdown, arguing on a Radio New Zealand broadcast "we can't even get access to our shops so why would we pay rent?"

Following the pandemic, Redcurrent started closing selected retail stores, including its Dunedin store in 2022. By January 2023, Redcurrent listed six retail store locations, representing a closure of nearly half of its stores following the COVID-19 pandemic.

Liquidation 
A liquidator was appointed on 13 February 2023 after Redcurrent became insolvent, owing over NZ$5 million according to the first liquidators' report. The company employed 23 staff at the time, and the liquidator arranged closure of their Wellington, Havelock North, and Queenstown locations that same month.

The liquidators' report cited a decline in sales in Redcurrent retail stores, high lease costs, and disruptions caused by the COVID-19 pandemic.

The liquidation process was hampered by the effects of Cyclone Gabrielle, disrupting deliveries during Recurrent's final sale. As of February 2023, Redcurrent has continued to operate their Christchurch and Auckland stores, as well as their online store, as the liquidation process continues.

Locations 
Redcurrent operated a number of brick-and-mortar stores across New Zealand, typically within shopping centres and malls.

North Island 

 Westfield Albany, Auckland
 Sylvia Park Shopping Centre, Mount Wellington, Auckland
 Westfield Newmarket, Auckland
 Havelock North, Hawke's Bay
 Bayfair Shopping Centre, Mount Maunganui, Tauranga
 Wellington Central, Wellington

South Island 

 The Colombo, Sydenham, Christchurch
 Merivale Mall, Christchurch
 Moray Place, Dunedin
 The Landing, Frankton, Queenstown

References 

Defunct retail companies of New Zealand
Homeware retailers of New Zealand
Retail companies disestablished in 2023
1999 establishments in New Zealand
2023 disestablishments in New Zealand